Marta Segú Rueda (born 22 June 1995) is a Spanish field hockey player.

Segú has represented the Spanish junior national team at two Junior World Cups, the first in Mönchengladbach, Germany in 2013, and the second in Santiago, Chile, in 2016. At the 2016 tournament, the Spanish team narrowly missed a medal, finishing in fourth place.

Segú first represented the senior national team in 2015, in a test match against Germany.

References

External links 
 

1995 births
Living people
Spanish female field hockey players